56th edition of the tournament. First season to have 8 teams after the return of Kuwaiti Division One.

Teams

Lists of teams and locations

Personnel and sponsorship

Foreign players

League table

Al-Salmiya SC lost 3 points by the decision of FIFA on 24 of June 2018 now stand on 30 points.

Play-Off
In this Seasons Play-Off match to determine who's the 8th team of the 2018–19 Kuwaiti Premier League,
Is between Al-Jahra SC and Al-Fahaheel FC

Awards

Top Scorer

Top Assist Provider

Player of the Month

References

External links
Kuwait League Fixtures and Results at FIFA
Kuwaiti Premier League (Arabic)
xscores.com Kuwait Premier League
goalzz.com - Kuwaiti League
RSSSF.com - Kuwait - List of Champions

Kuwait Premier League seasons
Premier League
Kuwaiti Premier League